Heritage Jail Museum also known as Jail Museum and Sangareddy District Jail is a 220-year-old colonial-era jail, now converted into a museum. It is located in Sangareddy, Sangareddy district of Indian state Telangana. The jail allows tourists to live a prisoner's life for 24 hours at a price of Rs.500 ($A9.90). The museum displays the paintings and other artifacts related to crime and prison life in India.

History 
According to the PWD Records, this imprison was built during the Prime Ministership of Salar Jung I in 1796 A.D., during Nizam rule in the princely state of Hyderabad. It was closed in 2012.

Museum
In June 2016, the jail was converted into a museum by prison department, when M. Lakshmi Narasimha, the Deputy SP of the jail came up with the Feel The Jail idea. We Can feel the jail there only by paying Rs 500 for twenty four hours without committing any crime. You will be treated like prisoners, You Have to wear prisoner's dress , and eat a food prepared by the prisoners in nearby jail and in the utensils which are provided to prisoners . You have to clean your utensils like a prisoner and you also have to do some work provided by the jail authorities such are gardening or any other simple task. You are not allowed to use your mobile . you are items such as mobile , wallet etc are kept in  locker which will be given to you when you leave the prison . If its become difficult for you remain in the prison until the full day ends you have to pay fine for it .This jail makes us  realize us the real value of freedom.

See also 
 List of jail and prison museums

References

External links 
 Telangana State Prison Department
 Telangana State Tourism

Museums in Telangana
Prisons in India
Prison museums in India
Museums established in 2016
1796 establishments in India
2016 establishments in Telangana